Dexterity, known as  in Japan, is a puzzle game by SNK that was released for the Game Boy in 1990. It is a game that consists of a square floor covered in seven rows and eight columns of tiles (56 tiles in total). The goal of the game is to flip all of the light tiles into dark tiles. There are several enemies as the level advances. The game has a total of 30 rounds.

References

External links
 GameSpot

1990 video games
Game Boy games
Game Boy-only games
Puzzle video games
SNK games
Video games developed in Japan